The Ingeegoodbee River is a perennial river of the Snowy River catchment, located in the Alpine regions of the states of New South Wales and Victoria, Australia.

Course and features
The Ingeegoodbee River rises in alpine country within the Snowy Mountain Range contained within Kosciuszko National Park, south of Thredbo in New South Wales. The river flows generally southeast by south and then southwest, flowing across the Black-Allan Line that forms part of the border between Victoria and New South Wales, joined by one minor tributary, before reaching its confluence with the Suggan Buggan River within the Alpine National Park in Victoria. The river descends  over its  course.

See also

 List of rivers of New South Wales (A-K)
 List of rivers of Australia
 Rivers of New South Wales

References

External links
 
 
 

East Gippsland catchment
Rivers of Gippsland (region)
Rivers of New South Wales
Snowy Mountains